Lokve pri Dobrniču is a small settlement immediately east of Dobrnič in the Municipality of Trebnje in eastern Slovenia. The area is part of the traditional region of Lower Carniola. The Municipality of Trebnje is now included in the Southeast Slovenia Statistical Region.

Name
The name of the settlement was changed from Lokve to Lokve pri Dobrniču in 1955.

References

External links
Lokve pri Dobrniču at Geopedia

Populated places in the Municipality of Trebnje